Joseph Collins (1866–1950) was an American neurologist, born in Brookfield, Conn.  He received the degree of M.D. from New York University in 1888, and after some years of private practice took up the specialty of neurology; in 1907, he was made a professor of that subject in the New York Post-Graduate Medical School.  He was later a co-founder and visiting physician to the New York Neurological Institute.

Bibliography 

In addition to his attainment as a practitioner of medicine, Dr. Collins wrote books and other literature. He is notable as the man who first reviewed James Joyce's novel Ulysses for the New York Times. His major writings, medical and secular, are:  
 Letters to a Neurologist (1908; second series, 1910)  
 The Way with the Nerves (1911)  
 Sleep and the Sleepless (1912)  
 Neurological Clinics (1918)  
 My Italian Year (1919)  
 The Doctor Looks at Literature. New York: George H. Doran Company, 1923.
 Taking the Literary Pulse. New York: George H. Doran Company, 1924.
 The Doctor Looks at Biography. New York: George H. Doran Company, 1925.
 The Doctor Looks at Love and Life. Garden City, N.Y.: Garden City Publishing Company, 1926.
 The Doctor Looks at Marriage and Medicine. Garden City, N.Y.: Doubleday, Doran and Company, 1928.
 The Doctor Looks at Life and Death. Garden City, N.Y.: Garden City Publishing Company, 1931.

External links
 New General Catalog of Old Books and Authors (list of books; source for death date)
 Joseph Collins' review of Ulysses for the New York Times on May 28, 1922
 

American science writers
Physicians from New York City
People from Brookfield, Connecticut
1866 births
1950 deaths
American neurologists
New York University Grossman School of Medicine alumni
Scientists from New York (state)